A total solar eclipse occurred on October 24, 1995. A solar eclipse occurs when the Moon passes between Earth and the Sun, thereby totally or partly obscuring the image of the Sun for a viewer on Earth. A total solar eclipse occurs when the Moon's apparent diameter is larger than the Sun's, blocking all direct sunlight, turning day into darkness. Totality occurs in a narrow path across Earth's surface, with the partial solar eclipse visible over a surrounding region thousands of kilometres wide.
The path of totality went through Iran, Afghanistan, Pakistan, India, southwestern tip of Bangladesh, Burma, Thailand, Cambodia, Vietnam, Spratly Islands, northeastern tip of Sabah of Malaysia, Philippines and Indonesia.

Observation

India 
An aerial observation of this eclipse was done over India, when a MiG-25 reconnaissance aircraft of the Indian Air Force was used to take images of this eclipse at an altitude of 25 km.

The Indian Institute of Astrophysics established camps along the path of totality in Rajasthan, Uttar Pradesh, Iradatganj and Diamond Harbour near Kolkata. Astronomers from other institutions and abroad from the Slovakia, Brazil, Russia, Japan and Germany joined IIA at its camps. Doordarshan and All India Radio made live coverages of the eclipse. The eclipse happened to occur on the day of the Diwali.

China 
Within the Spratly Islands claimed by China, only Cuarteron Reef was controlled by China and lay in the path of totality. Instead of going to the faraway island, The Popular Science Committee of the Chinese Astronomical Society, Beijing Astronomical Society, Beijing Planetarium and Beijing Astronomical Observatory (now incorporated into the National Astronomical Observatories of China) jointly organized observations abroad for the first time. A team of 4 was sent to Sikhio district, Nakhon Ratchasima, Thailand by the Beijing Planetarium, and successfully photographed the whole process of the eclipse, the corona at the greatest eclipse, and the Baily's beads at the 2nd and 3rd contact.

In addition, the Chinese Academy of Sciences, Ministry of Electronics Industry, China Earthquake Administration, State Education Commission (now Ministry of Education) and departments in charge of water conservancy and meteorology conducted joint observations on changes of solar radiation, ionosphere, geomagnetic field, radio and acoustic heavy waves, mainly in the Paracel Islands, Sanya, Haikou and Zhengzhou. From all these places, only a partial solar eclipse was visible instead of a total solar eclipse.

Images

Related eclipses

Eclipses of 1995 
 A partial lunar eclipse on April 15.
 An annular solar eclipse on April 29.
 A penumbral lunar eclipse on October 8.
 A total solar eclipse on October 24.

Solar eclipses 1993–1996

Solar 143

Metonic series

In popular culture
Phil Whitaker's prize-winning debut novel Eclipse of the Sun published in 1997 and set in India has at its centre a dramatic attempt to organize a public viewing of the eclipse.

Notes

References

Photos:
 Prof. Druckmüller's eclipse photography site
 Rušin from Nim Ka Thana, India
 Russian scientist had no successful observation of the eclipse
 Russian scientist had no successful observation of the eclipse (2) 
 The 1995 Eclipse in India

1995 10 24
1995 in science
1995 10 24
October 1995 events in Asia
1995 in Thailand
1995 in Iran
1995 in Afghanistan
1995 in Pakistan
1995 in Bangladesh
1995 in India
1995 in Myanmar
1995 in Cambodia
1995 in Vietnam
1995 in Malaysia
1995 in the Philippines
1995 in Indonesia